State Route 168 is a state highway in the state of Utah that spans  from Riverdale, Utah to Hill Air Force Base in Weber County.

Route description
This route is essentially a short access road to the former north gate at Hill Air Force Base. The southern terminus of this route is at the now-closed north gate of Hill Air Force Base. From there it travels downhill and northwest before turning northeast and ending at SR-60 (Riverdale Road).

History

On November 13, 1961, the Utah State Road Commission added the road from SR-60 to the north entrance of Hill Air Force Base entrance to the state highway system, and the state legislature approved it the next year. Although the north entrance has since been closed, the route has remained essentially unchanged.

Major intersections

References

External links

168
 168
 168